Andrés Rodríguez-Pose is a professor of economic geography at the London School of Economics and Political Science and former head of its Department of Geography and Environment (2006-2009).

Biography 
He was president of the Regional Science Association International (RSAI) (2015-2017). He has served as Vice-President of the RSAI (2014) and as Vice-President (2012-2013) and Secretary (2001-2005) of the European Regional Science Association. He is an editor of the international peer-reviewed academic journal Economic Geography and one of the editors-in-chief of the Journal of Geographical Systems. Between 1999 and 2016 he was an editor of Environment and Planning C, acting as joint chief-editor from 2008 to 2016.

He is a regular consultant to a number of international institutions, such as the European Commission, the European Investment Bank, the World Bank, the Cities Alliance, the OECD, the International Labour Organization, the Food and Agriculture Organization, the Inter-American Development Bank, and the Development Bank of Latin America. 

Among his honours is the 2018 ERSA Prize in Regional Science, considered to be among the highest awards in regional science, as well as Honorary Doctorates in Geosciences from Utrecht University and Economics from Jönköping University. 

In a 2020 article co-authored with Michael Storper, Rodríguez-Pose argued, contrary to most existing research, that zoning regulations have no impact on housing prices. A response piece to the article by several UCLA Luskin urban planning professors argued that the original article misrepresents existing research and draws faulty conclusions from data.

References

Year of birth missing (living people)
Living people
Regional scientists
Regional economists
Academics of the London School of Economics
Place of birth missing (living people)